The Romania men's national under-16 basketball team is a national basketball team of Romania, administered  by the Federatia Română de Baschet. It represents the country in men's international under-16 basketball competitions.

FIBA U16 European Championship participations

See also
Romania men's national basketball team
Romania men's national under-19 basketball team
Romania women's national under-16 basketball team

References

External links
Official website 
Archived records of Romania team participations

Basketball teams in Romania
Basketball
Men's national under-16 basketball teams